Dyspessa sochivkoi is a species of moth of the family Cossidae. It is found in Kirghizistan.

References

Moths described in 2008
Dyspessa
Moths of Asia